Strouhal (feminine: Strouhalová) is a Czech surname. It may refer to:

 Vincenc Strouhal (1850–1922), Czech physicist
 Grzegorz Strouhal (1942–2016), Polish sport shooter

See also
 
 Strouhal number
 7391 Strouhal

Czech-language surnames